Dry Bones in the Valley is a book written by Tom Bouman and was originally published by W. W. Norton & Company.

Awards 

 Edgar Award for Best First Novel in 2015
 Los Angeles Times Book Prize for Mystery/Thriller IN 2014

External links 
 Book review: ‘Dry Bones in the Valley,’ exciting debut thriller by Tom Bouman, Washington Post, 13 July 2014
 "Rural Noir - Tom Bouman’s ‘Dry Bones in the Valley,’ and More", New York Times, 6 July 2014
 As reviewed, Publishers Weekly

References 

Edgar Award-winning works
2014 American novels
2014 debut novels
W. W. Norton & Company books
Faber and Faber books